The Armenian Assembly of America is the largest Washington-based nationwide organization promoting public understanding and awareness of Armenian issues. The organization aims to "strengthen United States/Armenia relations, promote Armenia's democratic development and economic prosperity, and seeks universal affirmation of the Armenian genocide" via "research, education and advocacy."

History
In the early 1970's, Armenian-Americans decided to create an organization, headquartered in Washington, D.C., to represent and promote Armenian interests. With Armenian-American community members across the country, they launched the Armenian Assembly in 1972. Ultimately, the coalition did not hold, but in its place was born a non-partisan organization dedicated to promoting public understanding and awareness of Armenian issues.
 
The Assembly would go on to launch a broad array of programs and initiatives and firmly establish itself as an Armenian voice within U.S. public policy circles. It would pioneer initiatives to commemorate and reaffirm the Armenian genocide. And as early as 1977, the Assembly would introduce a summer intern program in Washington, DC that, some 32 years later, could claim more than 900 graduates.

Beginning in 1988 and thereafter, the Assembly addressed the unprecedented challenges of the 1988 Armenian earthquake, the Nagorno-Karabakh conflict and Armenia's independence movement.

With Administration support, the United States Congress mandated first-ever earthquake relief funding to then Soviet Armenia. Annual U.S. assistance became the norm, the next ten years totaling more than $1.4 billion. The Assembly was also instrumental in encouraging our friends in Congress to form a Congressional Caucus on Armenian Issues. It would become one of the largest caucuses, working side-by-side with the Assembly in supporting Armenian-American interests.

The Armenia Tree Project (ATP) was established in 1993 to assist the Armenian people in using trees to advance their social, economic and environmental recovery. Some 300,000 plantings later, ATP's vision continues to bloom throughout Armenia and Artsakh.

Efforts also continued unabated to secure universal reaffirmation of the Armenian genocide, enhanced significantly in 1997 with the launch of the Assembly's Armenian National Institute (ANI). ANI is at the forefront of efforts to affirm the Armenian genocide, responding to denial and advance knowledge and understanding of the Genocide and its consequences.

Completing three decades of non-partisan service, the Assembly family of organizations remains in the forefront of strengthening the U.S./Armenia and U.S./Artsakh relationships.

NGO Training and Resource Center
In April 1994, the Armenian Assembly of America established the NGO Training and Resource Center with support from the "Save the Children" USAID fund. The center aims to strengthen domestic Armenian Non-Governmental Organizations (NGOs) in hopes of encouraging wider participation in the democratic processes.  The center provides, to more than 300 local registered NGOs, the following services: 
 ten-week training program focusing on the leadership and management of the organization;
 technical assistance to help participants implement change within their organization;
 public relations department to raise public awareness about NGO Sector in Armenia and to promote their activities and projects;
 seminar/workshop series.

Spending
According to OpenSecrets.org, the Armenian Assembly of America allocated the following sums to its lobbying activities:
 2000 - $270,000
 2001 - $240,000
 2002 - $140,000
 2003 - $180,000
 2004 - $220,000
 2005 - $220,000
 2006 - $180,000
 2007 - $320,000

See also
 Armenia–United States relations
 Armenian American Action Committee (ARAMAC)
 Armenian American Political Action Committee
 Armenian-American
 Armenian National Committee of America
 Armenian lobby in the United States
 List of Armenian-Americans
 Armenian Diaspora
 Little Armenia, Los Angeles, California

References

External links
 

Armenian-American culture
Armenia–United States relations
Foreign policy political advocacy groups in the United States
Armenian genocide commemoration